Guang may refer to:
 Guang (vessel), an ancient Chinese drinking vessel
 Guang people, ethnic group of northern Ghana
 Guang languages, languages spoken by the Guang people
 Guangzhou, city in Guangdong, China
 Liangguang, Guangdong and Guangxi in China
 Helü, King of Wu, personal name Guang
 Guang (film), a 2018 Malaysian Mandarin-language film

See also
 Prince Guang (disambiguation)
 Kuan (disambiguation)
 Guan (disambiguation)